2nd Independent Division of Henan Provincial Military District() was formed on September 1, 1966 from Public Security Contingent of Henan province. The division was composed of four infantry regiments (4th to 7th).

On March 9, 1970 the division was renamed as Independent Division of Henan Provincial Military District() following 1st Independent Division of Henan Provincial Military District's renaming. Its regiments were renamed as follows:
1st Infantry Regiment (former 5th);
2nd Infantry Regiment (former 6th);
3rd Infantry Regiment (former 7th);
4th Infantry Regiment (not changed).

On February 9, 1973 the division was renamed as 2nd Independent Division of Henan Provincial Military District again following 50th Army Division's returning and renaming. its regiments were renamed back to their designations before March 1970.

On April 18, 1976 the division was disbanded.

References

IH2
Military units and formations established in 1966
Military units and formations disestablished in 1976